Reza Karimi is an Iranian born painter/artist living in New York.

Karimi was born in Isfahan, Iran on Aug 23 1946. Emigrated to New York in 1969 (US Citizen).

He attended Queens College, 1974 & Brooklyn College, 1978. He originally started working with watercolor paintings based on his childhood in Isfahan, but moved on to paintings of the New York area. In more recent years, he has moved on to more oil-based paintings of a political bent, reflecting on the political turbulence of Iran, including the trial of Mossadegh and the treatment of women in Iran.

Education
 Queens College, 1974
 Brooklyn College, 1978

Displays of creative works 
 Putnam Arts Council, 1987
 Borghi's & Co, New York City, 1990
 Mina Renton Gallery, London, 1992
 Hammer Galleries, New York City, 1993
 Creator / Editor Memories of Iran, 1991
 Neuberger Museum of Art, Purchase NY 1996 & NYC 1997
 Hammer Galleries, New York 1997
 The Dorchester, London 1998

Notable awards
Grant, Ancient Persepolis, Fine Arts Ministry 1966 (Awarded 1st prize in professional show)
Putnam Arts Council, 1987 (1st prize in professional show)

Bibliography
Portrait of an Artist (film) 1992
Exhibition Review at Hammer (film) 1993
Aftab Productions, WNYC TV Network

Member
Am Inst for Conservation
Putnam Arts Council

Media
Watercolor, Oil on Canvas

Publications
Contributor, Technology in the service of art (Armon Magazine 9-91)

Interviews
Ispand Magazine, Summer 1993
Exceptional Images, Glochin Publications, July 1994
Persian Heritage, Fall 1996
Hunter of light and Memories, Golchin Publications, May 1998
Bahrain Clientele, Victoria von Sydow, March/April 2008

Dealer
Art Restoration Inc. (PO Box 29 School St, Mahopac Falls NY 10542)

References

Iranian artists
American artists
Artists from New York (state)
American people of Iranian descent
1946 births
Living people
Brooklyn College alumni